Eotettix pusillus, the little eastern grasshopper, is a species of spur-throated grasshoppers in the family Acrididae. It is found in North America.

References

 Brunke A, Majka C (2010). "The adventive genus Xantholinus Dejean (Coleoptera, Staphylinidae, Staphylininae in North America: new records and a synthesis of distributional data". . ZooKeys 65: 51-61.
 Capinera J.L, Scott R.D., Walker T.J. (2004). Field Guide to Grasshoppers, Katydids, and Crickets of the United States. Cornell University Press.
 Otte, Daniel (1995). "Grasshoppers [Acridomorpha] C". Orthoptera Species File 4, 518.

Further reading

 Arnett, Ross H. (2000). American Insects: A Handbook of the Insects of America North of Mexico. CRC Press.

Melanoplinae
Insects described in 1904